Panagiotis Sarris (born 14 September 1975) is a retired Greek sprinter who specialized in the 200 metres.

He won the bronze medal at the 2001 Mediterranean Games and finished eighth in 4 x 100 m relay at the 2006 IAAF World Cup. He also competed at the 2004 Olympic Games, the World Championships in 1997(4x400m),1999(200-4x400m), 2003 (200-4x400m 6th) and 2005 (200m), without reaching the final and the European Championships in 1998 (200-4x400m), 2002(100m) and 2006 (200m).

Finished sixth in 4x400 m relay at the 2003 World Championship (45.08 sec ) and seventh in 200 m at the 1999 World University Games.Competed at the Mediterranean Games in 1997,2001,2009.

His personal best time in the 200 metres is 20.48 seconds, achieved in July 2002 in Rethimno.  In the 100 metres his personal best time is 10.17 seconds, achieved in July 2002 in Rethimno and in the 400 metres 46.37 seconds, achieved in July 2003 in Athens.

Honours

References 
 

1975 births
Living people
Greek male sprinters
Athletes (track and field) at the 2004 Summer Olympics
Olympic athletes of Greece
Mediterranean Games bronze medalists for Greece
Athletes (track and field) at the 2001 Mediterranean Games
Mediterranean Games medalists in athletics
21st-century Greek people